Braj Mohan Ram (born 1 January 1958 in Chandwa, Palamau district) is an Indian politician and member of the Bharatiya Janata Party. Ram was a member of the Lok Sabha from 1996 to 2004 from the  Palamu constituency in Palamau, Jharkhand.

He was elected to Bihar Legislative Assembly from 1991 to 1995.

References 

1958 births
People from Palamu district
Bharatiya Jana Sangh politicians
Bharatiya Janata Party politicians from Jharkhand
Members of the Bihar Legislative Assembly
Living people
Lok Sabha members from Jharkhand
India MPs 1996–1997
India MPs 1998–1999
India MPs 1999–2004